Dorothy Bromiley Phelan (born 18 September 1930) is a British former film, stage and television actress and authority on historic domestic needlework.

Life 
Born in Manchester, Lancashire, the only child of Frank Bromiley and Ada Winifred (née Thornton). Bromiley played a role in a Hollywood film before returning to the UK where, in 1954, she started work as assistant stage manager at the Central Library Theatre, Manchester; followed by a West End stage role in The Wooden Dish directed by the exiled US film and theatre director Joseph Losey (who became Bromiley's husband from 1956 to 1963). They have a son by this relationship, the actor Joshua Losey. Since 1963 Bromiley has lived with the Dublin-born actor and writer Brian Phelan (who appeared in the 1965 film Four in the Morning), they have a daughter, Kate.

Education 
Bromiley attended the Royal Academy of Dramatic Art.

Films
Bromiley successfully auditioned for the role of Gloria in the Hollywood film The Girls of Pleasure Island (Paramount, 1952). Her major roles in several British films include sixth former Paulette at Angel Hill Grammar School (aged 26 at the time) in It's Great to Be Young (1956) in which Bromiley's singing voice for the Paddy Roberts/ Lester Powell Ray Martin song "You are My First Love" was dubbed by Edna Savage (and by Ruby Murray in the pre-credits sequence), Rose in A Touch Of The Sun (1956) co-starring with Frankie Howerd, Sarah in Zoo Baby (1957) with Angela Baddeley, Small Hotel (1957), Angela in The Criminal (1960) and a minor role in The Servant (1963), the latter two directed by Losey.

Television
Bromiley made her television drama debut as Pauline Kirby in "The Lady Asks For Help" (1956) an episode of Television Playhouse produced by Towers of London for ITV. This was followed by the role of Ann Fleming in "Heaven and Earth" (1957) part of the Douglas Fairbanks Presents series for ATV. Directed by Peter Brook, it also starred Paul Scofield and Richard Johnson, and was set on board a plane that develops engine trouble. Bromiley also had roles in such popular television series as The Adventures of Robin Hood (1956) as Lady Rowena ("Hubert" episode), Armchair Theatre (1957), Play of the Week ("Arsenic and Old Lace") (1958), Saturday Playhouse ("The Shop at Sly Corner") (1960), Z-Cars (1964), The Power Game (1966) and No Hiding Place (1965, 1966), and the television play Jemima and Johnny (1966). Her last television drama role was as Sarah Malory in Fathers and Families (BBC Television, 1977) directed by Christopher Morahan.

Later career
Bromiley taught at the London Academy of Music and Dramatic Art (LAMDA) between 1966–72 and left to create The Common Stock Theatre Company, staging socially relevant theatre in colleges and non-traditional halls.

Authority on domestic needlework 
Retired from acting, Bromiley lives in Dorset, and has developed an interest in 16th and 17th century amateur domestic needlework, writing on the subject, and curating two major exhibitions.

Works 
 The Point of the Needle: Five Centuries of Samplers and  Embroideries, an Exhibition of Needlework at the Dorset County Museum.
 The Goodhart Samplers (www.needleprint.com ) with Eva Lotta Hansson and Jacqueline Holdsworth, 2008

References

External links 
 
 Levenshulme personal website featuring a letter from Bromiley and extensive set of photographs and posters

Alumni of the Royal Central School of Speech and Drama
1930 births
Living people
Actresses from Manchester
Alumni of RADA